Roamer Alexis Angulo (born 25 March 1984) is a Colombian professional boxer who challenged for the WBO super middleweight title in 2018 and the WBC super middleweight title in August 2020.

Professional career

Roamer turned professional in 2010 and won 23 fights in a row with 20 coming by way of Knockout. In his 24th fight he would earn his first world title opportunity against Mexican world champion Gilberto Ramírez.

Professional boxing record

References

External links

1984 births
Living people
Sportspeople from Cauca Department
Colombian male boxers
Super-middleweight boxers
21st-century Colombian people